Nicolás Freitas Alleges (born 3 July 1993) is a Uruguayan rugby union player. He currently plays for Jaguares in the Super Rugby.

In January 2017, he signed his first professional contract with Argentine side Jaguares.

References

External links

1993 births
Living people
Uruguayan rugby union players
Uruguay international rugby union players
Jaguares (Super Rugby) players
Place of birth missing (living people)
Peñarol Rugby players
Rugby union centres
Rugby union wings
Rugby Club Vannes players
Rugby union players from Montevideo